The 1938 Miami Hurricanes football team represented the University of Miami as a member of the Southern Intercollegiate Athletic Association (SIAA) in the 1938 college football season. The Hurricanes played their home games at Burdine Stadium in Miami, Florida. The team was coached by Jack Harding, in his second year as head coach for the Hurricanes.

Schedule

References

Miami
Miami Hurricanes football seasons
Miami Hurricanes football